Double Dare is a mystery television series that was broadcast on CBS for only one season in 1985, on Wednesday nights at 8:00 pm ET. The premise for this show is similar to that of the earlier series It Takes a Thief.

Plot
Professional thief Billy Diamond is captured by San Francisco Police Lieutenant Samantha Warner, who offers him a deal: if he uses his burglary skills to work undercover for the police, he won't have to go to jail. Diamond agrees, on the condition that his former partner in crime, Ken Sisko, is sprung from jail to work as his partner in crimefighting.

Cast
 Billy Dee Williams as Billy Diamond
 Ken Wahl as Ken Sisko
 Janet Carroll as Lt. Samantha Warner
 Joseph Maher as Sylvester

Episodes
Seven episodes were made, but only six were broadcast.

References

External links
 
 

1980s American mystery television series
1985 American television series debuts
1985 American television series endings
1980s American drama television series
CBS original programming
Television shows set in San Francisco